The men's 110 metres hurdles event at the 1971 Pan American Games was held in Cali on 4 and 5 August.

Medalists

Results

Heats
Wind:Heat 1: +2.0 m/s, Heat 2: +1.9 m/s

Final
Wind: +4.5 m/s

References

Athletics at the 1971 Pan American Games
1971